Joe Cannata (born January 2, 1990) is an American professional ice hockey goaltender who is currently playing with IK Oskarshamn in the Swedish Hockey League (SHL). Cannata was selected by the Vancouver Canucks in the sixth round, 173rd overall, of the 2009 NHL Entry Draft after his freshman season at Merrimack where he played in 23 games. Internationally, Cannata has represented the United States at the IIHF World Under-18 Championship in Kazan, Russia.

Playing career

Amateur
Joe Cannata played high school hockey at Boston College High School. In his junior year he helped lead the team to its second consecutive Super Eight Championship. Shortly after the victory he was invited to attend a try out for the U-18 US NTDP. This was followed by an invitation to play for Merrimack College in the Hockey East Conference.

Cannata made his collegiate debut with the Merrimack Warriors on October 18, 2008 against Army. He stopped all 44 shots to become the first goaltender in school history to register a shutout in his first career game. In his junior and senior years he was regularly regarded as one of the top goalies in the Hockey East Association conference.

Professional
On March 21, 2012, Cannata signed an entry-level contract with the Vancouver Canucks.  On April 2, 2012 he signed an amateur try-out contract with Vancouver's AHL affiliate Chicago Wolves.  He made his professional hockey debut on April 15 for the final regular season game for Chicago. Cannata made 38 saves and earned the 4–2 win over the Peoria Rivermen. He was subsequently released from his tryout contract on April 16 as he was ineligible to play for the team in the playoffs.  Later that year, Cannata returned to Merrimack where he completed his business degree. On April 25, 2013 Cannata was called up to parent club, the Vancouver Canucks.

On July 1, 2016, Cannata left the Canucks as a free agent to sign a one-year, two-way deal with the Washington Capitals. In the 2016–17 season, Cannata was assigned to AHL affiliate the Hershey Bears. In 22 games with the Bears, Cannata was victorious in 11 games however was relegated to third-string status and assigned to ECHL affiliate, the South Carolina Stingrays on February 14, 2017. At the NHL trade deadline, he was dealt by the Capitals to the Colorado Avalanche in exchange for Cody Corbett on March 1, 2017. He was directly assigned to add a veteran presence to AHL affiliate, the San Antonio Rampage.

On July 1, 2017, Cannata as a free agent opted to remain with the Avalanche, agreeing to a one-year, two way contract. Signed to add an organizational depth to the goaltending position, Cannata was recalled early in the 2017–18 season, to accompany the team to Sweden for two regular season games against the Ottawa Senators. Upon the club's return to Denver, Cannata was re-assigned to secondary affiliate, the Colorado Eagles of the ECHL. Cannata posted a league best .931 save percentage, collecting 21 wins through 28 games on route to helping the Eagles capture their second successive Kelly Cup.

On July 2, 2018, Cannata re-signed to continue his association with the Avalanche on a one-year, two-way contract. In the 2018–19 season, Cannata played primarily at the ECHL level with the Utah Grizzlies, posting 17 wins in 40 games.

On May 17, 2019, Cannata opted to pursue a European career, and signed a one-year contract with IF Björklöven of the Swedish HockeyAllsvenskan.

In August 2020, Cannata signed a two year contract with IK Oskarshamn of the Swedish Hockey League.

Career statistics

Regular season and playoffs

International

Awards and honors

Records

Merrimack College
Career wins: 59 (2008–2012)

References

External links 

1990 births
Living people
AHCA Division I men's ice hockey All-Americans
American men's ice hockey goaltenders
Boston College High School alumni
Chicago Wolves players
Colorado Eagles players
Hershey Bears players
Ice hockey players from Massachusetts
IF Björklöven players
Kalamazoo Wings (ECHL) players
Merrimack Warriors men's ice hockey players
Ontario Reign (ECHL) players
IK Oskarshamn players
People from Wakefield, Massachusetts
San Antonio Rampage players
Sportspeople from Middlesex County, Massachusetts
South Carolina Stingrays players
USA Hockey National Team Development Program players
Utah Grizzlies (ECHL) players
Utica Comets players
Vancouver Canucks draft picks